The Diamantina Developmental Road is a gazetted road  in Queensland, Australia, that runs from Charleville in the south-central part of the state to Mount Isa in the north-west.

Route description 

The road passes through the towns of Quilpie, Eromanga, Windorah, Bedourie, Boulia, and Dajarra in its 1344 kilometer length, and most of it is sealed. Some sections between Windorah and Boulia are unsealed.  The section from Boulia to Mount Isa is also known as the Boulia Mount Isa Highway and the section from Bedourie to Boulia is also known as the Boulia Bedourie Road. The section from the Eromanga boundary to the Windorah CBD is also known as the Quilpie Windorah Road.

The road crosses several well known rivers and creeks of the Channel Country of south-west Queensland, including the Paroo River, Bulloo River, Cooper Creek and Diamantina River.

Responsible authority

Maintenance of the road is the responsibility of the Queensland Government.

Northern Australia Beef Roads upgrade
The Northern Australia Beef Roads Program announced in 2016 included the following project for the Diamantina Developmental Road.

Rehabilitation and widening
The project to rehabilitate and widen the road from Boulia to Dajarra was completed in mid 2019 at a total cost of $5 million.

Other upgrades

Widen narrow seal
A project to widen the narrow seal on almost  of road immediately south of Boulia, at a cost of $2.145 million, was completed in June 2021.

Reconstruct and widen
A project to reconstruct and widen  of road immediately north of Boulia, at a cost of $1.025 million, was completed in April 2021.

Widen and seal
A project to widen and seal two sections of road west of Charleville, at a cost of $6.65 million, was completed in March 2022.

Floodway upgrade
A project to upgrade the Top Limestone Creek floodway, at a cost of $1.5 million, was completed in September 2020.

Major intersections

References

External links

Roads in Queensland
Highways in Queensland